Fuckersberg is a populated place (Ortschaft) in the municipality of Zell an der Pram, Schärding District in Upper Austria, Austria. As of 1 January 2019, population was 21.

By 1843, Fuckersberg had been mentioned as a populated place in Zell an der Pram.

References

Cities and towns in Schärding District